VLS may refer to:

Vapor-Liquid-Solid method, a method of growing nanocrystals
Vermont Law School
Vertical Launching System for firing missiles
Von Luschan's chromatic scale of skin colour
West Flemish, a dialect in Belgium, ISO 639-3 code
 Vertical Lift System, a style of Scissor doors
VideoLAN Server
Valk Last Slot, a set of speedcubing algorithms

See also
VLS-1, the Brazilian Space Agency satellite launcher